The 2023 Manitoba general election is scheduled to occur on October 3, 2023 to elect members to the Legislative Assembly of Manitoba. The incumbent Progressive Conservative Party of Manitoba will attempt to win a third term in government, having won the 2016 and 2019 elections. On August 10, 2021, incumbent premier Brian Pallister announced that he would not seek re-election, and shortly after, resigned. Heather Stefanson was chosen by Progressive Conservative Party of Manitoba members to succeed Pallister's successor, Premier Kelvin Goertzen.

Legislature summary

|- 
!rowspan="2" colspan="2"|Party
!rowspan="2"|Leader
!rowspan="2"|Candidates
!colspan="4"|Seats
!colspan="3"|Popular vote
|-
!2019
!Current
!Next
!+/-
!Votes
!%
!+/-

|align=left|Heather Stefanson
|– |27||36 |||35|| || || || ||

|align=left|Wab Kinew
|– |31||18 ||18 || || || || ||

|align=left|Dougald Lamont
|– |9||3 ||3 || || || || ||

|align=left|
|– ||– ||– ||–||–|| || ||

|align=left|Manitoba
|align=left|Wayne Sturby
|– ||– ||–||–||–|| || ||

|align=left|Frank Komarniski
|– ||– ||– ||–||–|| || ||

|align=left|Keystone
|align=left|Kevin Friesen
|– ||– ||–||–||–|| || ||
|-

 
| colspan="2" style="text-align:left;"|Independents 
|2||– ||– || –||–|| || ||
|- 

| colspan="4" style="text-align:left;"|Vacant
| |1||||| –|| || ||
|-
| colspan="5" |
|-
| style="text-align:left;" colspan="3"|Blank and invalid votes
| || || |||||||| ||
|-
| style="text-align:left;" colspan="3"|Total
|67 ||57 ||57 ||–|||||| ||
|-
| style="text-align:left;" colspan="3"|Registered voters/turnout
| || || |||||||| ||
|}

Incumbents not running for reelection

Candidates

Opinion polls
Voting intentions in Manitoba since the 2019 election

By-Elections prior to 2023 Election

Opinion poll sources

References

Manitoba
Elections in Manitoba
2020s in Manitoba
Manitoba
October 2023 events in Canada